Misplaced Ideals is the second studio album by English rock band Sad Café, released in April 1978 by RCA Records. Despite no singles being released from the album and its lack of commercial success, it peaked at number 50 on the UK Albums Chart. The album wasn't released in North America, where instead it was decided that a compilation album, also titled Misplaced Ideals, of the band's first two albums be released.

Reception 
Reviewing the album for Record Mirror, Mary Ann Ellis gave the album 3 out of 5 and wrote "Sad Cafe are going to need all the help they can get selling this record which is probably why they've employed shock tactics on the cover... guaranteed to stop record shop browsers in their racks. 'Misplaced Ideals' is just another recruit to that, growing army of average albums. Not bad, not good. Competent but unexciting eliciting neither orgasms nor groans. Just another variation (or is it?) on the same well worn (out) theme. There are some good (standard) rocky numbers which are spoilt by being overlong and afflicted with tedious sax and guitar solos. Self-indulgence rules (and ruins) here. Sad Cafe fall into a kind of no band'sland as far as audience appeal goes. They're too sophisticated for the heavy brigade and their style is still not distinctive enough to earn them much of a cult following. And their songs at the moment have little commercial appeal."

Cover art
The original album cover featured a photograph of a man pulling off a rubber face mask, only to reveal another face underneath. The striking image was created for RCA by Storm Thorgerson. The photograph of a distorted rubber face being pulled apart proved controversial, and RCA decided to re-release the album for the European market with a different cover, a picture of a family of sunbathers walking on a beach. The North American release featured an illustration of a woman holding a cocktail, and in Japan, the album was released with a black cover showing only the eye of the face mask.

Track listing

Personnel 
Sad Café

 Paul Young – lead vocals, percussion
 Ashley Mulford – lead guitar
 Vic Emerson – keyboards
 John Stimpson – bass guitar, backing vocals
 Ian Wilson – electric guitar, acoustic guitar, backing vocals, percussion
 Tony Cresswell – drums

Additional personnel

 Lenni Zaksen – saxophone
 John Punter – additional percussion
 Doreen Chanter, Irene Chanter, Liza Strike – additional vocals on "Feel Like Dying"
 Nigel Walker, Jon Walls – assistant engineers
 Vic Emerson – strings arrangement and synthesisation
 Iain Scott – photography of live band
 Hipgnosis – sleeve design and photography (for original album release)

North American album 

This album was only released in the US and Canada and is a compilation of songs from Sad Café's first two studio albums, Fanx Ta-ra and Misplaced Ideals, neither of which were released there. It was released in November 1978 by A&M Records. "Run Home Girl" and "Feel Like Dying" were released as singles, with the former reaching number 71 on the Billboard Hot 100 in 1979. The album also charted at number 94 on the Billboard 200. "Run Home Girl" is also a shorter, edited version of the original UK release.

The album was reissued on CD in 2008 by Renaissance Records and the 2011 album download included 4 bonus tracks, which were the four songs from the original UK release of the album not included on this compilation.

Reviewing this LP, Robert Christgau wrote in Christgau's Record Guide: Rock Albums of the Seventies (1981): "In which the decade's most paradoxical, characteristic, and disgusting pop-music synthesis—combining hard rock's compulsive riff energy with MOR's smooth determination to displease no one—is achieved without recourse to jazz rhythms or semiclassical decoration. Misplaced ideals my ass—they threw them down the deepest hole they could find."

Track listing 

2011 download bonus tracks:

References 

1978 albums
Sad Café (band) albums
Albums produced by John Punter
RCA Records albums
1978 compilation albums
A&M Records compilation albums
Music controversies